The 2010 MLS season was the fourth season in Toronto FC's existence. The club was looking to make the playoffs for the first time in their history and ultimately fell short.  TFC started the season with Preki as the new head coach however, on September 14, 2010, he along with the Director of Soccer Mo Johnston were relieved of their duties; and Nick Dasovic took over as head coach on an interim basis.

Club

Coaching staff

Squad
As of October 10, 2010. 

(on loan to Serbian White Eagles)

Transfers

In

Out

Competitions
Updated to games played October 23, 2010.

Regular season

Standings
Conference

Overall

Results summary

Results by round

CONCACAF Champions League

Group Stage Standings

Matches

Preseason

2010 Walt Disney World Pro Soccer Classic

2010 Carolina Challenge Cup

Major League Soccer regular season

Canadian Championship

CONCACAF Champions League

Mid-Season Friendly

Squad statistics

Players

Disciplinary records

1Player is no longer with team

References

Toronto FC seasons
Toronto FC
Toronto FC
Toronto FC